Robert Badman (5 August 1882 – 30 September 1914) was a British fencer. He competed in the individual sabre event at the 1908 Summer Olympics.

References

1882 births
1914 deaths
British male fencers
Olympic fencers of Great Britain
Fencers at the 1908 Summer Olympics